Pleuranthodendron is a genus of flowering plants in the family Salicaceae. It consists of one species (Pleuranthodendron lindenii) of small to medium-sized trees native to the neotropics, specifically Central America and northern South America.

Formerly placed in the heterogeneous family Flacourtiaceae, Pleuranthodendron is now classified in Salicaceae, along with close relatives Hasseltia and Macrothumia, with which they are commonly confused.

References

Salicaceae
Salicaceae genera
Flora of Central America
Flora of South America
Trees of Central America
Trees of South America
Monotypic Malpighiales genera